The 2003 European Weightlifting Championships were held in Loutraki, Greece. It was the 82nd edition of the event.

Medal overview

Men

Women

Medal table

References
Results (sports123)

European Weightlifting Championships
2003 in weightlifting
International weightlifting competitions hosted by Greece
2003 in Greek sport